Galvarinus is a genus of snakes of the family Colubridae.

Geographic range
All species in the genus Galvarinus are endemic to South America.

Species
The following 3 species are recognized as being valid.
 Galvarinus attenuatus Walker, 1945 - Walker's slender snake
 Galvarinus chilensis Schlegel, 1837 - Chilean slender snake 
 Galvarinus tarmensis Walker, 1945 - slender snake 

Nota bene: A binomial authority in parentheses indicates that the species was originally described in a genus other than Galvarinus.

References

Galvarinus
Snake genera